Count Aurél Dessewffy de Csernek et Tarkeő (16 January 1846 – 28 March 1928) was a Hungarian politician, who served as Speaker of the House of Magnates between 1906 and 1910. He also functioned as board member of the Hungarian Academy of Sciences (MTA). He was the last judge royal of the Kingdom of Hungary from 1917 to 1918.

He was the son of Count Emil Dessewffy, president of the Hungarian Academy of Sciences. Aurél married Countess Pálma Károlyi, the single daughter of Count Tibor Károlyi, who served as Speaker of the House of Magnates between 1898 and 1900.

Works
 Közlekedés ügyében tárgyalt kérdések (co-author with Endre György, Budapest, 1881)
 A gazdakör hitelügyi bizottságának emlékirata (co-author with József Schmidt, Budapest, 1884)

References
 Jónás, Károly – Villám, Judit: A Magyar Országgyűlés elnökei 1848–2002. Argumentum, Budapest, 2002. pp. 233–236

1846 births
1928 deaths
Speakers of the House of Magnates
Judges royal
Aurel
20th-century Hungarian politicians